The Wings of Freedom Flitplane is an American single-seat, high-wing, single-engine ultralight aircraft that is available as a kit aircraft or as plans for amateur construction from Wings of Freedom of Hubbard, Ohio.

The Flitplane was designed as a low-cost aircraft with the look of an antique aircraft design for the US FAR 103 Ultralight Vehicles category with its maximum  empty weight requirement.

In late 2019 the company website had been taken down and it is likely that production had ended.

Development
The Flitplane was designed in 1995 by Ed Fisher who also designed the Skylite ultralight and the Micro-Mong home-built aircraft. The design was acquired by Joe Naylor and Mark W. Klotz who formed Wings of Freedom Aviation Inc. in 1996 to develop the design and market it.

Naylor and Klotz made many changes to the design but retained the antique look of the aircraft and its distinctive large triangular windshield.

The Flitplane's fuselage is fabricated from a welded truss of 4130 steel tubing. The  wings are of aluminum "ladder-type" construction, are strut-braced and utilize jury struts. The fuel tank is integrated into the wing centre-section. The wings and tail are covered in doped aircraft fabric. The engine is mounted in front of the high wing, above the cockpit. The original powerplant was a  Cuyuna 460 engine, with a  Rotax 447 optional. Later engine options added included the  Hirth F-33, the  Zanzottera MZ 201 and the Kawasaki 440  engine.

The conventional landing gear is suspended using fibreglass axles. The tailwheel is steerable. The controls are conventional three-axis and include full-span ailerons. The large, flat-plate triangular windshield protects the pilot from the propeller blast and has distinctive cut-outs for the rudder pedals.

The Flitplane is available as plans, a complete kit, partial kits or as a finished and ready-to-fly aircraft. The company claims that the aircraft can be built from the kit in 100 hours or 500 hours from plans.

Specifications (Flitplane)

See also

References

External links
 Official website archives
 Photo of a Flitplane
 Wings of Freedom Flitplane review

1990s United States ultralight aircraft
Wings of Freedom aircraft
Aircraft first flown in 1995
High-wing aircraft
Single-engined tractor aircraft